Ferdinand is a city in Idaho County, Idaho, United States. The population was 159 at the 2010 census, up from 145 in 2000. At the southern end of the Nez Perce Indian Reservation, it was founded by F.M. Bieker shortly after the reservation was opened for settlement in 1895. It was named after Ferdinand, Indiana, where his mother's family had lived.

Geography
  

Transportation

Highway
 - US 95 - to Craigmont (north) and Cottonwood (south)
Northbound U.S. Route 95 was formerly routed westward through town as Main Street, first passing underneath the railroad tracks. Exiting town, old US-95 then resumed northward, following a descending tributary into Lawyers Creek Canyon.

After years of planning, the highway was re-routed in 1993; the straighter US-95 now bypasses Ferdinand on its east side and stays east of the railroad and above the canyon. It crosses Lawyers Creek on a  bridge (photo) which opened in October 1991 and passes over the site of the previous  bridge, built in 1948.

Railroad
The second subdivision of the Camas Prairie Railroad arrived in Ferdinand in 1909, branching off the main line at Spalding and ending at Grangeville. The line on the Camas Prairie has gone under several ownership changes since 1998; it is now operated by BG&CM Railroad and terminates in Cottonwood. Passenger service on the line ended  in 1955.

Demographics

2010 census
As of the census of 2010, there were 159 people, 63 households, and 47 families residing in the city. The racial makeup of the city was 93.7% White, 0.6% Native American, 0.6% Asian, 1.3% from other races, and 3.8% from two or more races. Hispanic or Latino of any race were 3.8% of the population.

There were 63 households, of which 38.1% had children under the age of 18 living with them, 57.1% were married couples living together, 6.3% had a female householder with no husband present, 11.1% had a male householder with no wife present, and 25.4% were non-families. 22.2% of all households were made up of individuals, and 9.6% had someone living alone who was 65 years of age or older. The average household size was 2.52 and the average family size was 2.87.

The median age in the city was 38.5 years. 27% of residents were under the age of 18; 5.8% were between the ages of 18 and 24; 27% were from 25 to 44; 27.7% were from 45 to 64; and 12.6% were 65 years of age or older. The gender makeup of the city was 55.3% male and 44.7% female.

2000 census
As of the census of 2000, there were 145 people, 60 households, and 40 families residing in the city. The racial makeup of the city was 98.62% White, 0.69% Native American, and 0.69% from two or more races.

There were 60 households, out of which 36.7% had children under the age of 18 living with them, 55.0% were married couples living together, 6.7% had a female householder with no husband present, and 31.7% were non-families. 31.7% of all households were made up of individuals, and 18.3% had someone living alone who was 65 years of age or older. The average household size was 2.42 and the average family size was 3.00.

In the city, the population was spread out, with 30.3% under the age of 18, 6.9% from 18 to 24, 25.5% from 25 to 44, 21.4% from 45 to 64, and 15.9% who were 65 years of age or older. The median age was 35 years. For every 100 females, there were 93.3 males. For every 100 females age 18 and over, there were 102.0 males.

The median income for a household in the city was $26,250, and the median income for a family was $35,625. Males had a median income of $25,750 versus $22,917 for females. The per capita income for the city was $13,513. There were 2.9% of families and 9.9% of the population living below the poverty line, including 20.0% of under eighteens and 11.8% of those over 64.

References

External links
 Lawyers Canyon Bridge photograph

Cities in Idaho
Cities in Idaho County, Idaho